The Department of Digital Humanities (DDH) is an academic department and research centre in the Faculty of Arts & Humanities at King's College London. DDH counts amongst the "most visible" digital humanities centres worldwide. Its research activities cover themes such as digital cultures, past and present; technology, media and participation; data worlds; digital economy and society; and digital epistemology and methods.

The department was established by Professor Harold Short in 1991 as the Centre for Computing in the Humanities. It changed to its present name in 2011. The department researches digital culture and society, and explores the use of advanced technology-related methods in arts and humanities research. It was ranked first in the UK in the latest Research Excellence Framework in its category 'Communication, Cultural and Media Studies, Library and Information Management'.

The department runs a Bachelor's degree in Digital Culture which looks at how technological innovations are bringing about new challenges and opportunities in our societies. It also offers the level of a master's degree including in Digital Humanities, Digital Culture and Society,  Digital Asset & Media Management, and Big Data in Culture & Society, as well as a PhD research degree in Digital Humanities. Stuart Dunn is Head of Department and among its academics are Kate Devlin, Nick Srnicek, and Mercedes Bunz.

The department established the annual Willard McCarty Fellowship in 2018 in honour of Professor Willard McCarty's contribution to the field of digital humanities and to the department, and to support "outstanding scholars whose work interrogates the value of a human-machine dialogue for greater understanding of the human mind, condition, culture, and society".

See also
King's College London
Digital Classicist
Digital Humanities
Humanistic informatics
Humanist (electronic seminar)

References

External links

Departments of King's College London
Digital Humanities Centers